Bramka may refer to the following places:
Bramka, Kuyavian-Pomeranian Voivodeship (north-central Poland)
Bramka, Lublin Voivodeship (east Poland)
Bramka, Warmian-Masurian Voivodeship (north Poland)